Violet Fults Bidwill Wolfner (January 10, 1900 – January 29, 1962) was the owner of the Chicago / St. Louis Cardinals of the National Football League (NFL) for over 14 years, from 1947 until her death in early 1962. She inherited the team in April 1947, following the death of her husband Charles Bidwill, Sr., who purchased the team in 1933. She was the first woman to become principal owner of an NFL team.

Early life
Wolfner was born Violet Fults in Red Bud, Illinois, the daughter of Alonzo Fults, of German and Irish descent, and Mary Ann "Mamie" Vogel, of German descent. She had an older sister, Imelda. Her father died in 1906 and her mother worked as a waitress.

Chicago Cardinals
Bidwill's first season as owner saw the Cardinals, led by the "Dream Backfield" of Paul Christman, Pat Harder, Marshall Goldberg, and Charley Trippi, defeat the Philadelphia Eagles for the franchise's first undisputed league championship. They made it to the league title game again in 1948, but lost to the Eagles in a rematch in the snow. The Cardinals had only four more .500 seasons under her ownership.

Move to St. Louis
Bidwill married St. Louis businessman Walter H.S. Wolfner (1898–1971) in 1949, becoming known as Violet Bidwill Wolfner. When the Bears of George Halas slowly began becoming the favorite of the Chicago area, the Wolfners moved the team to St. Louis after the 1959 season.

Death
Wolfner died in a physician's office in Miami Beach, Florida, on January 29, 1962, and is buried at Queen of Heaven Cemetery in Hillside, Illinois. In her will, she split her more than 80% interest in the Cardinals between her adopted sons from her first marriage, Charles Bidwill Jr. and Bill Bidwill, the club president and vice-president.

The will was contested in court by her second husband, who was the managing director of the football team. The Illinois Supreme Court upheld the will, in favor of the sons, in February 1963. Wolfner sought to invalidate the legal adoption of the two sons, who had eliminated his position with the team in May 1962.

Wolfner's wardrobe was auctioned off in November 1963. Among the 25,000 items were 1,000 coats and dresses and 1,500 pairs of shoes, many never worn; the auction fetched more than $40,000.

References

External links
 St. Louis Post-Dispatch – photo of Pop Ivy and Violet Bidwill Wolfner – December 1960
 

1900 births
1962 deaths
St. Louis Cardinals (football) owners
Bidwill family
20th-century American businesswomen
20th-century American businesspeople
American people of German descent
American people of Irish descent
People from Red Bud, Illinois
Women National Football League executives
Women sports owners
Chicago Cardinals owners